The article presents a discography for American country artist Sonny James.

Studio albums

1950s

1960s

1970s and 1980s

Christmas albums

Live albums

Compilation albums

Singles

1950s

1960s

1970s

1980s

Other singles

Guest singles

Charted B-sides

Notes 

A^ "Since I Met You Baby" also peaked at number 38 on the RPM Adult Contemporary Tracks chart in Canada.

References 

Country music discographies
Discographies of American artists